Black Sea Bichebi Batumi (Black Sea Guys of Batumi), most commonly known as B.S.B. Batumi, is a Georgian handball team from Batumi. They compete in the National Handball Championship of Georgia.

European record

Team

Current squad 

Squad for the 2016–17 season

Goalkeepers
 Korneli Andriadze
 Giorgi Samkurashvili 

Wingers
RW
  Irakli Gogoladze 
  Igor Vinogradski
LW 
  Zurab Abramishvili
Line players 
  Shota Grishikasvili
  Ucha Maisuradze

Back players
LB
  Rezo Chanturia 
  Akaki Kavelashvili
  George Kvernadze
CB 
  Ilia Gogaladze
  George Kobakhidze 
  Giorgi Surmava 
  Georgi Omar Tsivtsivadze 
RB
  Levan Berdzenishvili
  Nano Kardava

External links
 EHF Club profile

References

Handball in Georgia (country)